is a rural district located in Aomori Prefecture, Japan. The district makes up the suburban area of the Aomori metropolitan area.

As of September 2013, the district had an estimated population of 24,011 and an area of 652.83 km2. Much of the city of Aomori was formerly part of Higashitsugaru District. In terms of national politics, the district is represented in the Diet of Japan's House of Representatives as a part of the Aomori 1st district.

Towns and villages
Hiranai
Imabetsu
Sotogahama
Yomogita

History
The area of Higashitsugaru District was formerly part of Mutsu Province. At the time of the Meiji Restoration of 1868, the area consisted of one towns (Aomori) and 137 villages, formerly under the control of Hirosaki Domain and 28 villages under the control of Kuroishi Domain. Aomori Prefecture was founded on December 13, 1871, and Higashitsugaru District was carved out of the former Tsugaru District on October 30, 1878.
 

With the establishment of the municipality system on April 1, 1889, Higashitsugaru District, organized into one town (Aomori) and 24 villages, was established. When a municipality is elevated to, or is absorbed into a city, it ceases to be part of a district. For example, when the village, Nonai was incorporated into the city of Aomori as a neighborhood, it ceased to be part of a rural district.

1898 – Aomori was elevated to city status.
1919 – Aburakawa was elevated to town status.
1928 – Kominato was elevated to town status
1939 – Aburakawa was merged into the city of Aomori
1941 – Kanita was raised to town status
1951 – Tsutsui was raised to town status
1955 – Kominato absorbed two neighboring villages to become the town of Hiranai. Imabetsu was also raised to town status
1962 – Nonai was merged into Aomori.
On March 28, 2005 - the town of Kanita and the villages of Tairadate and Minmaya were merged to form the new town of Sotogahama.

References

Districts in Aomori Prefecture
Aomori metropolitan area